HMS Frolic was an 18-gun  of the Royal Navy. She was built by Boole, of Bridport and was launched on 9 February 1806. Although she took part in the capture of Martinique, Guadaloupe, and Saint Martin, she appears to have had an uneventful career until 8 October 1812, when the American sloop-of-war  captured her after a fierce fight. Later that day the British recaptured Frolic and captured Wasp. Frolic was broken up in 1813.

Career
On 26 October 1807, Tsar Alexander I of Russia declared war on Great Britain. The official news did not arrive there until 2 December, at which time the British declared an embargo on all Russian vessels in British ports. Frolic was one of some 70 vessels that shared in the seizure of the 44-gun Russian frigate Speshnoy (Speshnyy), then in Portsmouth harbour. The British seized the Russian storeship Wilhelmina (Vilghemina) at the same time. The Russian vessels were carrying the payroll for Vice-Admiral Dmitry Senyavin’s squadron in the Mediterranean.

Frolic, under Commander Thomas Whinyates, sailed for the West Indies on 21 February 1808. There she participated in the Invasion of Martinique in February 1809, and then in the invasion of Guadeloupe. In 1847 the Admiralty authorized the issuance of the Naval General Service Medal with clasps "Martinique" and "Guadaloupe".

The Admiralty had sent them there to assess separately and independently the survival prospects for someone landed at this place without food and water. Captain Warwick Lake of  had marooned an impressed seaman, Robert Jeffrey, there on 13 December 1807, and was now the subject of an Admiralty investigation. They reported back that survival prospects were poor. As it turned out, Jeffrey was alive, a passing American vessel having rescued him. Still, a court-martial dismissed Lake from the Royal Navy.

Frolic vs. Wasp

In October 1812 the Frolic was serving on the North American station, protecting a convoy of six merchantmen off Virginia. On a passage from the Bay of Honduras, a gale dispersed the convoy and carried away Frolics main top yard and sprung her main top mast.

On 18 October, while the convoy was reassembling and Frolic was working on the damage, a strange sail was spotted. Frolic sent the convoy on its way and hoisted a Spanish ensign as a ruse to buy time.

The ships closed. Initially Frolic fired more rapidly but less accurately, but the gale damage had rendered her unmanageable. Within 40 minutes Wasp had repeatedly raked Frolic, killing 15 and wounding 43 out of the 120 seamen and boys aboard, including Whinyates. The Americans boarded Frolic and all resistance stopped. The Americans had 5 killed and 5 wounded.

Frolic was only temporarily in American hands. Later that day the British 74-gun  captured both ships. Captain John Poo Beresford of Poictiers restored Whinyates to command of Frolic. The subsequent court martial for the loss of the ship honorably acquitted Whinyates, his officers and his men.

Fate
Frolic was recommissioned later in October under Lieutenant Andrew Mitchell (acting). His commission as commander was confirmed on 24 August 1813. Earlier, on 20 July 1813, Frolic was one of four British vessels sharing in the capture of the American ship Fame.

Frolic continued in service until being broken up at Portsmouth in November 1813. Her captured ensign was on display at Mahan Hall at the U.S. Naval Academy, but was removed on 27 February 2018 for preservation.

See also
List of ships captured in the 19th century
Bibliography of 18th-19th century Royal Naval history

Notes, citations, and references
Notes

Citations

References
 
 
 
 
 
 
  
 

 

Cruizer-class brig-sloops
Ships built in England
1806 ships
Captured ships
Vessels captured by the United States Navy
War of 1812 ships of the United Kingdom